Lockatong Creek is a  tributary of the Delaware River in Hunterdon County, New Jersey in the United States.

Lockatong is derived of a Munsee phrase — lokatink, or “place of wheat meal".

See also
List of rivers of New Jersey

References

External links
 U.S. Geological Survey: NJ stream gaging stations

Tributaries of the Delaware River
Rivers of Hunterdon County, New Jersey
Rivers of New Jersey